"Yellow Orange Rays" is a song by Australian-born singer-songwriter, record producer, and remix engineer Sam Sparro. The song was released as a b-sided digital single on 9 November 2012 to Dutch iTunes. It is the third single from his sophomore studio album Return to Paradise, within the country of Belgium.

The single entered the Belgian Ultratop Chart on 29 December at No. 92, enviably peaking at No. 74, it managing to stay on the chart for four consecutive weeks. Two weeks earlier in the country, on the week of 15 December, the single entered the Dance Bubbling Under Chart at #4; on this chart "Yellow Orange Rays" peaked at No. 2 and maintained this chart position for three consecutive weeks, managing to stay on the charts for six consecutive weeks in all, the last three weeks of December 2012 and first three weeks of January 2013.

Background
Jesse Rogg, who is a close friend of Sparro's is usually the main producer on his works, but was only involved in the post production of "Yellow Orange Rays". Tim Anderson produced the track, also writing it with Sparro. Bethany Cosentino of Best Coast sings backing vocals for "Yellow Orange Rays" as well as contributing to the song as a writer. Piano in the song is by Charlie Willcocks, who has worked with Sparro before on the songs "Still Hungry" from his debut album, Sam Sparro, and appears not only as a pianist on the song "Happieness", but a writer.

Track list

Personnel
Credits adapted from the liner notes of Return to Paradise.

 Tim Anderson – writing
 Bethany Cosentino – writing
 John Fields – mixing
 Jesse Rogg – post production
 Ryan Shields – percussion
 Sam Sparro – vocals, writing, synths, additional piano
 Charlie Willcocks – piano

Chart performance

Weekly charts

References

2012 singles
Sam Sparro songs
2012 songs
EMI Records singles
Songs written by Sam Sparro
Songs written by Tim Anderson (musician)